is a Japanese manga artist born in Sapporo, Hokkaidō. She made her professional debut in the September 10, 1995 issue of LaLa DX with the one-shot title  . Matsuri is known for her manga series Vampire Knight, which was made into an anime series.

Works

References

External links
  
 Matsuri Hino list of works at Hakusensha 
 
 Matsuri Hino interview and profile at Hakusensha (archive) 
 Hakusensha's Comicate issue 67 Interview with Matsuri Hino 
 Hakusensha's Comicate issue 63 Interview with Matsuri Hino 

Year of birth missing (living people)
Japanese female comics artists
Female comics writers
Living people
Women manga artists
Manga artists from Hokkaido
People from Sapporo
Japanese women writers